"Spend My Life with You" is a song recorded by Japanese singer Ki-Yo for his third studio album, Reborn (2013). It was written and produced by Ki-Yo.

This song was released on July 1, 2012 on iTunes and Amazon MP3 as the third single from his third studio album "Reborn". Also, this song was included in his compilation EP "KI-YO Single Collection Vol.1".

Music video 
The music video was produced by Alexander. It was uploaded on YouTube on January 30, 2013.

References 

2012 singles
2012 songs
Pop ballads
2010s ballads
Songs written by Ki-Yo